NSS may refer to:

Arts and entertainment
 New Star Soccer, a computer game
 Newsstand Specials, a spinoff of Playboy magazine
 Nintendo Super System, an arcade game cabinet that plays Super NES games
 Northern Sound System, a youth music education centre and venue in Adelaide, South Australia
 NSS, a 1958 computer chess program

Organizations

Government bodies
 National Security Secretariat (United Kingdom), part of the Cabinet Office
 National Security Service (United States), an office in the American FBI
 National Security Service (Maldives), former name of the Maldivian armed forces
 National Security Service (Somalia), a former primary intelligence agency 
 National Seismological Service, an agency of the Mexican government
 National Service Scheme, a Government of India-sponsored program for community service and social activities
 National Statistical Service of the Republic of Armenia, former name of the Statistical Committee of Armenia
 NHS National Services Scotland, the central support agency to the NHS in Scotland

Political parties
 People's Socialist Party of Montenegro, a political party in the Republic of Montenegro
 National Power Unity, a far-right party in Latvia
 People's Peasant Party (Narodna seljačka stranka), a political party in Serbia

Schools
 National Sport School (Canada), a high school in Alberta, Canada
 Nauru Secondary School, a high school in Nauru
 National Socialist Schoolchildren's League (Nationalsozialistischer Schülerbund), the organization for school pupils in the Third Reich
 Northbrooks Secondary School, a secondary school in Yishun, Singapore
 Northern Secondary School, a high school in Toronto, Canada

Companies
 National Screen Service, an American company involved in cinema advertising
 New Skies Satellites, the former name of the Dutch spacecraft operator SES NEW SKIES
 Norsk Spisevognselskap, a dining car company of Norway

Other organizations
 Nair Service Society, a community welfare organization for the Nair community from Kerala, India
 National Space Society, an international space advocacy organization
 National Sculpture Society, US
 National Secular Society, a British organization
 National Speleological Society, an American organization
 Nilachala Saraswata Sangha, a religious organization
 National Service Scheme, Indian government-sponsored public service programme

Politics and government

 National Security Strategy (United States)
 National Shelter System, a database of emergency shelters in the US administered by the Federal Emergency Management Agency 
 National Student Survey, a survey of final-year degree students in the UK
 Nuclear Security Summit, a summit on nuclear security established by US President Obama

Science and technology

Computing
 Name Service Switch, a technology used in UNIX
 Namespace Specific String, a part of the syntax of a Uniform Resource Name
 Network Security Services, cryptographic software libraries for client and server security
 Network switching subsystem, a component of the mobile-phone network
 Novell Storage Services, a file system used by the Novell NetWare operating system
 NSS, a 1958 computer chess program

Other uses in science and technology
 Neurological soft signs, signs of disturbance in neurology
 Neutral salt spray, a salt spray test to qualify the corrosion resistance of coatings on metal
 Normal saline solution, in medicine

Other uses
 Naked short selling, a restricted practice in stock trading
 Nostalgia Super Stock, a drag racing class

See also
 NS (disambiguation)